Rokas Čepanonis (born 14 March 1989) is a former PRO Lithuanian basketball player finished career in 2019. |NKL]]

References

1986 births
Living people
Lithuanian men's basketball players
Basketball players from Vilnius
Centers (basketball)